The Remarkables were a 1980s band from Palmerston North, New Zealand. One of the band's members Alan Gregg has gone on to feature in a number of other New Zealand bands including The Mutton Birds and Marshmallow. The other members of the band were Brendan Conlon – Drums(The Urchins, Burt Real, Black Wings, High Lords), Paul Westbury, Guitar and vocals and Chris Heaphy, Guitar and vocals. The band's name coincides with that of The Remarkables, a mountain range in New Zealand's South Island.

External links
AudioCulture profile

New Zealand musical groups